Termignon is a former commune in the Savoie department in the Auvergne-Rhône-Alpes region in south-eastern France. On 1 January 2017, it was merged into the new commune Val-Cenis. It is ideally located in the Maurienne region with good transport links in and out of Modane, Lyon, Geneva and Chambéry.

Geography

Climate

Termignon has a humid continental climate (Köppen climate classification Dfb).

Economy
The famous but rare and expensive Bleu de Termignon cheese is made in Termignon.

See also
Communes of the Savoie department

References

Former communes of Savoie